Anna Vladlenovna Samokhina (14 January 1963 – 8 February 2010)  was a Russian actress. Samokhina started her film career in the 1980s and quickly became popular due to her talent, beauty and charm. She is best known as the leading actress in Yuri Kara's Barons of Crime (rus. Воры в законе), a most outlandish, brutal and controversial Soviet film, about mafia and corruption in the late USSR.

At the end of the 1990s, Samokhina stopped working in cinema, focusing primarily on her private life and restaurant business. In 2008, she returned to cinema and participated in several pictures.

In November 2009, Anna Samokhina was diagnosed with stomach cancer at a late stage. Until 1 February 2010, Russian press and many actors in country did not know that her illness was very serious. She died on 8 February 2010 in a hospital in Saint Petersburg.

Selected filmography
 1988: The Prisoner of Château d'If as Mercedes
 1988: Barons of Crime as Rita
 1989: Don César de Bazan as Maritana
 1990: Frenzied Bus as Tamara Fotaki
 1992: Detonator as She
 1993: Angelica's Passion as Angelica Kudrina
 1994: The Wheel of Love as Ekaterina L'vovna
 1996: Train to Brooklyn as Vera
 1999: Chinese Tea-Set as Zinaida Voloshina
 1999: Streets of Broken Lights as Larisa
 2010: In the Style of Jazz as wife of Viktor Ivanovich

References

External links
 

1963 births
2010 deaths
Soviet film actresses
Russian film actresses
Soviet stage actresses
Russian stage actresses
Russian television actresses
Deaths from stomach cancer
Deaths from cancer in Russia
Russian restaurateurs
Russian television presenters
Russian women television presenters